Kuznechikha is a rural locality (a village) in Krasnopolyanskoye Rural Settlement, Nikolsky District, Vologda Oblast, Russia. The population was 107 as of 2002.

Geography 
Kuznechikha is located 6 km southeast of Nikolsk (the district's administrative centre) by road. Rodyukino is the nearest rural locality.

References 

Rural localities in Nikolsky District, Vologda Oblast